Alfredo Magarotto (16 February 1927 – 22 January 2021) was an Italian Roman Catholic bishop.

Magarotto was born in Italy and was ordained to the priesthood in 1950. He served as bishop of the Roman Catholic Diocese of Chioggia, Italy, from 1990 to 1997 and as bishop of the Roman Catholic Diocese of Vittorio Veneto, Italy, from 1997 to 2003. He returned briefly after retirement to the Roman Catholic Diocese of Vittorio Veneto in the year 2007 as diocesan Administrator.

Notes

1927 births
2021 deaths
21st-century Italian Roman Catholic bishops
20th-century Italian Roman Catholic bishops